Thomas J. Shear was a member of the Wisconsin State Assembly.

Biography
Shear was born on September 25, 1836 in Concord, New York. He moved to Hillsboro (town), Wisconsin in 1858. During the American Civil War, Shear served with the 47th Wisconsin Volunteer Infantry Regiment of the Union Army. He died in 1901.

Shear's son, Byron D. Shear, and son-in-law, Oscar A. Mitscher, both became Mayor of Oklahoma City, Oklahoma. His grandson, Marc Mitscher, became an admiral in the United States Navy.

Political career
Shear was a member of the Assembly during the 1882 and 1889 sessions. Additionally, he was the clerk of Hillsboro and the superintendent of schools of Vernon County, Wisconsin. He was a Republican.

References

See also

People from Erie County, New York
People from Hillsboro, Wisconsin
Republican Party members of the Wisconsin State Assembly
City and town clerks
School superintendents in Wisconsin
People of Wisconsin in the American Civil War
Union Army soldiers
1836 births
1901 deaths
Burials in Wisconsin
Educators from New York (state)
19th-century American politicians
19th-century American educators